The Blassenstein Formation is a geologic formation in Austria. It preserves fossils dated to the Jurassic period.

See also

 List of fossiliferous stratigraphic units in Austria

References
 

Geologic formations of Austria
Jurassic System of Europe
Jurassic Austria